Partial general elections were held in Belgium on 25 May 1902.
The result was a victory for the Catholic Party, which won 54 of the 85 seats up for election in the Chamber of Representatives. Voter turnout was 95.7%.

Under the alternating system, elections were only held in five out of the nine provinces: Antwerp, Brabant, Luxembourg, Namur and West Flanders. In addition to the regular elections for these 85 seats, elections were held for one seat (6 in total) in Ghent-Eeklo, Aalst, Soignies, Charleroi, Liège and Verviers because the number of representatives increased for these electoral arrondissements following the population census.

A month earlier, a general strike was held, aimed at forcing electoral reform and notably the end of the system of plural voting. However, it was unsuccessful. The Catholic Party, being against reform, even strengthened their majority in the elections.

Results

Constituencies
The distribution of seats among the electoral districts was as follows. Several arrondissements got one or more additional seats, following the population census.

References

Belgium
1900s elections in Belgium
General
Belgium